Lennart Ginman (born March 1960) is a Danish-Finnish bassist, composer and music producer. He has cooperated with artists like Steen Jørgensen, lead singer of Sort Sol in two joint albums, and Kirk Lightsey, an American jazz pianist with a joint album.

He is part of the trio GinmanBlachmanDahl made up of him on bass, Thomas Blachman on drums and Carsten Dahl on piano. The trio released two albums in 2003 and 2004.

Discography
Albums

Awards and nominations
1991 – Won the Danish Music Awards, for playing bass: Thomas Blachman & the X-traditional Values, “Love Boat”
1995 – Won the Danish Music Awards, for playing bass: Jen Winther’s Quartet, “The Planets”
1995 – Won the Jasa Prize (givet af Danmark’s jazz journalistser og kritikere). 
1999 – Won the Danish Music Awards in the category “Danish Producer of the Year” (Lennart Ginman)
1999 – Won the Danish Music Awards in the category “Danish Album of the Year” (Ginman/Jørgensen)
1999 – The album “Ginman/Jørgensen” received several recognitions, i.e. it was chosen to be Danish Album of the Year by four Danish new papers and by the Danish music magazine Gaffa.
2002 – Icelandic Grammy together with Sigurdur Flosason, “Stairway To The Stars”
2008 – Nominated the Steppeulv Award in the category “Musician of the Year”
2008 – Received 3-year grant from Statens Kunstfond
2009 – Won the Danish Ben Webster Prize

See also
List of Danish composers

References

External links
Official homepage

Danish bass guitarists
Male bass guitarists
Danish record producers
Danish composers
Male composers
1960 births
Living people